Keeranatham is a part of the Coimbatore city.  Keeranatham is one of the fast-growing neighbourhoods of Coimbatore due to presence of many IT companies. Keeranatham is likely to be called as IT Hub of Coimbatore Region with presence of IT-SEZ. It is present 4 km away from Saravanampatti which is a connector with Sathyamangalam Road. SEZ has a village road connecting Saravanampatti which is surrounded by beautiful agriculture lands and that are being transforming into apartments and shops. A view of western Ghats surrounding the campus is an added advantage.

Neighbourhoods in Coimbatore